Alabama Gas Corporation, known as Alagasco was the largest natural gas utility in the north and central part of Alabama. It was headquartered in Birmingham and at its peak provided natural gas energy to 460,000 homes and businesses.  

In 2014, Energen Corporation sold Alagasco to The Laclede Group of St. Louis. After the acquisition of several other energy holdings, the company was rebranded as Spire in 2017.  

Within Spire Inc., service territory formerly under Alagasco is now referred to as Spire Alabama Inc.

External links
 
 The Spire Inc website

References

Defunct natural gas companies of the United States
Companies based in Birmingham, Alabama
Energy in Alabama
Companies established in 1852
1852 establishments in Alabama